Dame Maroie or Maroie de Dregnau/Dergnau de Lille (fl. 13th century) was a trouvère from Arras, in Artois, France. She was identified as the Maroie de Dregnau de Lille from whom a single strophe of a single chanson remains, "Mout m'abelist quant je voi revenir" (in a typical trouvère form, ABABCDE), along with its music. She debates Dame Margot in a jeu parti, or debate song, "Je vous pri, dame Maroie." This song survives in two manuscripts, which each give separate and unrelated melodies. Dame Maroie is the addressee in a grand chant by Andrieu Contredit d'Arras.

References
Notes

Bibliography

Coldwell, Maria V. "Margot, Dame, and Maroie, Dame", Grove Music Online, ed. L. Macy (accessed October 21, 2006), grovemusic.com  (subscription access).
Coldwell, Maria V. "Maroie de Dregnau de Lille", Grove Music Online, ed. L. Macy (accessed October 22, 2006), grovemusic.com  (subscription access).

13th-century French women writers
13th-century French poets
13th-century women composers
People from Arras
French women writers
Trouvères
Medieval women poets